This is a list of notable events in music that took place in the year 1953.

Specific locations
1953 in British music
1953 in Norwegian music

Specific genres
1953 in country music
1953 in jazz

Events
February 6 – Contralto Kathleen Ferrier, already terminally ill with cancer, leaves Covent Garden Opera House in London on a stretcher after being taken ill on the second night of her run-in Gluck's Orfeo ed Euridice.
March 12 – Heinrich Sutermeister's opera Romeo and Juliet receives its English première at Sadler's Wells Theatre in London, conducted by James Robertson.
April – Pat Boone begins his recording career at Republic Records.
May 26 – Werner Meyer-Eppler, Fritz Enkel, Herbert Eimert and Robert Beyer open a pioneering electronic music studio at the Cologne studios of the NWDR.
July 16–29 – The Internationale Ferienkurse für Neue Musik are held at Darmstadt.
July 18 – Elvis Presley's Sun recordings: Elvis Presley makes his first recordings (a copy of which is owned by Jack White when he wins an auction on eBay in January 2015).
September 27 – Helen Traubel ends her long association with the Metropolitan Opera in New York City after having appeared in Chicago as a night-club singer.
October – Sir Arthur Bliss replaces Sir Arnold Bax as Master of the Queen's Music in the United Kingdom.
 October 5 – Wilhelm Furtwängler and the soloists in the Vienna State Opera's production of Don Giovanni publicly protest against the suspension of Egon Hilbert as administrator of the Burg Theater and State Opera.
 October 19 – Opening of the Covent Garden opera season in London, with a production of Wagner's Die Walküre.
 October 30 – Ernst Marboe is announced as the new administrator of the Vienna State Opera and Burg Theater, replacing Egon Hilbert.
 November 2 – the Metropolitan Opera announces that a new two-year contract has been agreed with the musicians' union, averting a threatened strike by the orchestra.
 November 17 – Carl Ebert is announced as the new Intendant of the Städtische Oper, (West) Berlin.
 December 7 – the La Scala opera season opens with a production of Alfredo Catalani's La Wally, to mark the hundredth anniversary of the composer's birth.
Alfred Schnittke becomes a student of Evgeny Golubev.
Frank Sinatra begins recording at Capitol.
"Crazy Man, Crazy", recorded by Bill Haley & His Comets, becomes the first rock and roll single to make the Billboard national American musical charts.
American singer Frankie Laine sets the all-time United Kingdom record for weeks at Number One in a given year on the UK Singles Chart, when his hit singles "Answer Me," "Hey Joe!" and "I Believe" hold the top slot for 27 weeks: a little over half a year. "I Believe", Number One for 18 weeks, also holds the all-time record for a single. Over 50 years later, both records will still hold.
Eddie Fisher becomes "The Coca-Cola Kid" on the television show Coke Time at a salary of one million dollars a year.
The Platters form in Los Angeles.
The Erato Records label is founded to promote French classical music.

Albums released
Anita O'Day Collates – Anita O'Day
The Astaire Story – Fred Astaire
Broadway's Best – Jo Stafford
By the Light of the Silvery Moon – Doris Day
Calamity Jane – Doris Day
Country Girl – Bing Crosby
Dean Martin Sings – Dean Martin
Dinah Shore Sings the Blues – Dinah Shore
Georgia Gibbs Sings Oldies – Georgia Gibbs
Jazz at Massey Hall – The Quintet
Kay Starr Style – Kay Starr
Let There Be Love – Joni James
May I Sing To You – Eddie Fisher
New Concepts of Artistry in Rhythm – Stan Kenton
Portrait Of New Orleans – Jo Stafford and Frankie Laine
Requested By You – Frank Sinatra
Sinatra Sings His Greatest Hits – Frank Sinatra
Songs by Tom Lehrer – Tom Lehrer
Songs of Open Spaces – Guy Mitchell
Starring Jo Stafford – Jo Stafford

Biggest hit singles
The following singles achieved the highest chart positions 
in the limited set of charts available for 1953.

US No. 1 hit singles
These singles reached the top of US Billboard magazine's charts in 1953.

Top hits on record

Top R&B and country hits on record
"The Clock" – Johnny Ace with the Beale Streeters
"Hound Dog" – Big Mama Thornton
"I Forgot More Than You'll Ever Know"- The Davis Sisters
"(Mama) He Treats Your Daughter Mean"- Ruth Brown
"Mess Around" – Ray Charles
"Please Don't Leave Me" – Fats Domino
"Your Cheatin' Heart" – Hank Williams

Published popular music
 "And This Is My Beloved" w. & m. adapted Robert Wright & George Forrest
 "Angel Eyes" w. Earl Brent m. Matt Dennis
 "Anna" w.(Eng) William Engvick (Ital) F. Giordano m. R. Vatro
 "Answer Me, My Love" w. (Eng) Carl Sigman (Ger) & m. Gerhard Winkler & Fred Ravich
 "Baubles, Bangles And Beads" w. & m. adapt Robert Wright & George Forrest. Introduced by Doretta Morrow in the musical Kismet
 "Bell Bottom Blues" w. Hal David m. Leon Carr
 "Bimbo" w.m. Rodney Morris
 "Black Hills Of Dakota" w. Paul Francis Webster m. Sammy Fain. Introduced by Doris Day in the film Calamity Jane.
 "The Boy Friend" w.m. Sandy Wilson.
 "Can-Can" w.m. Cole Porter
 "Caribbean" w.m. Mitchell Torok
 "C'est Magnifique" w.m. Cole Porter. Introduced by Lilo and Peter Cookson in the musical Can-Can
 "Changing Partners" w. Joe Darion m. Larry Coleman
 "Chicka Boom" w.m. Bob Merrill
 "Crying In the Chapel" w.m. Artie Glenn
 "Cry Me a River" w.m. Arthur Hamilton
 "Dragnet" w.m. Walter Schumann
 "Ebb Tide" w. Carl Sigman m. Robert Maxwell
 "Eh, Cumpari!" trad Ital w. m. adapt. Julius LaRosa & Archie Bleyer
 "Ev'rybody Loves Saturday Night" Campbell
 "Fate" w. & m. adapt Robert Wright & George Forrest from music by Alexander Borodin Adapted from Symphony No. 2 in B Minor. It was introduced by Alfred Drake and Doretta Morrow in the musical Kismet.
 "From Here to Eternity" w. Robert Wells m. Fred Karger
 "Gambler's Guitar" w.m. Jim Lowe
 "Gee!" w.m. Viola Watkins, Daniel Norton & William Davis
 "Giddy-Up-A Ding Dong" w.m. Freddie Bell, Pep Lattanzi
 "Goodnite, Sweetheart, Goodnite" James Hudson, Calvin Carter
 "Half a Photograph" w. Bob Russell m. Hal Stanley
 "The Happy Wanderer" w.(Ger) Florenz Siegesmund & Edith Möller (Eng) Antonia Ridge m. Friedrich Wilhelm Möller
 "Here's That Rainy Day" w. Johnny Burke m. Jimmy Van Heusen. Introduced by John Raitt in the musical Carnival In Flanders.
 "Hold My Hand" w.m. Jack Lawrence & Richard Myers
 "I Believe" w.m. Ervin Drake, Jimmy Shirl, Irvin Graham & Al Stillman
 "I Can Do Without You" w. Paul Francis Webster m. Sammy Fain. Introduced by Doris Day and Howard Keel in the film Calamity Jane.
 "(Oh Baby Mine) I Get So Lonely" w.m. Pat Ballard
 "I Love Paris" w.m. Cole Porter. Introduced by Lilo in the musical Can-Can
 "I Really Don't Want To Know" w. Howard Barnes m. Don Robertson
 "I'm Walking Behind You" w.m. Billy Reid
 "Istanbul (Not Constantinople)" w. Jimmy Kennedy m. Nat Simon
 "It's All Right With Me" w.m. Cole Porter
 "It's Love" w. Betty Comden & Adolph Green m. Leonard Bernstein. Introduced by George Gaynes in the musical Wonderful Town. Performed in the 1955 London production by Dennis Bowen.
 "Just Walkin' In The Rain" w.m. Johnny Bragg & Robert S. Riley
 "Little Things Mean a Lot" w.m. Carl Stutz & Edith Lindeman
 "Look at That Girl" w.m. Bob Merrill
 "Make Love to Me" w. Alan Copeland & Bill Norvas Music from "Tin Roof Blues" 1923.
 "The Man That Got Away" w. Ira Gershwin m. Harold Arlen
 "The Man With The Banjo" w. (Eng) Robert Mellin m. Fritz Schulz Reichel
 "Marriage Type Love" w. Oscar Hammerstein II m. Richard Rodgers. Introduced by Arthur Maxwell and Helena Scott in the musical Me And Juliet.
 "Matilda, Matilda!" w.m. Harry Thomas
 "Melancholy Serenade" m. Jackie Gleason
 "Mexican Joe" w.m. Mitchell Torok
 "Money Burns a Hole In My Pocket" w. Bob Hilliard m. Jule Styne. Introduced by Dean Martin in the 1954 film Living It Up.
 "Money Honey" w.m. Jesse Stone
 "My Love, My Love" w. Bob Haymes m. Nick Acquaviva
 "No Other Love" w. Oscar Hammerstein II m. Richard Rodgers. Introduced by Isabel Bigley and Bill Hayes in the musical Me And Juliet.
 "Non Dimenticar" w.(Eng) Shelley Dobbins (Ital) Michele Galdieri m. P. G. Redi
 "Not Since Nineveh" w. & m. adapt Robert Wright & George Forrest  From Borodin's "Polovetsian Dances".
 "Oh! My Pa-Pa" w. John Turner & Geoffrey Parsons m. Paul Burkhard
 "The Olive Tree" w. & m. adapt Robert Wright & George Forrest from music by Alexander Borodin
 "Rags to Riches" w.m. Richard Adler & Jerry Ross
 "Ricochet" w.m. Larry Coleman, Joe Darion & Norman Gimbel
 "Rock Around the Clock" w.m. Jimmy De Knight & Max C. Freedman
 "Santa Baby" w.m. Joan Javits, Phil Springer & Tony Springer
 "Satin Doll" w.m. Billy Strayhorn & Duke Ellington
 "Secret Love" w. Paul Francis Webster m. Sammy Fain. Introduced by Doris Day in the film Calamity Jane
 "Seven Lonely Days" w.m. Alden Shuman, Earl Shuman & Marshal Brown
 "Shake a Hand" w.m. Joe Morris
 "Sippin' Soda" adapt. P. Campbell
 "The Song From "Moulin Rouge"" (a.k.a. "Where Is Your Heart") w. (Eng) William Engvick (Fr) Jacques Larue m. Georges Auric
 "Stranger in Paradise" w. & m. adapt Robert Wright & George Forrest. Introduced by Doretta Morrow and Richard Kiley in the musical Kismet.
 "Such a Night" w.m. Lincoln Chase
 "Sway" ("Quien Será") w. (Eng) Norman Gimbel (Sp) Pablo Beltrán Ruiz m. Pablo Beltran Ruiz
 "Teach Me Tonight" w. Sammy Cahn m. Gene De Paul
 "Tell Me a Story" w.m. Terry Gilkyson
 "Tell Us Where the Good Times Are" w.m. Bob Merrill
 "That's Amore" w. Jack Brooks m. Harry Warren
 "Vaya con Dios" w.m. Larry Russell, Inez James & Buddy Pepper
 "Wanted" w.m. Jack Fulton & Lois Steele
 "When Love Goes Wrong" w. Harold Adamson m. Hoagy Carmichael from the film Gentlemen Prefer Blondes
"You Won't Forget Me" w. Kermit Goell m. Fred Spielman Introduced by India Adams dubbing for Joan Crawford in the film Torch Song
 "You, You, You" w.(Eng) Robert Mellin (Ger) Walter Rothenberg m. Lotar Olias
 "Young at Heart" w. Carolyn Leigh m. Johnny Richards

Classical music

Premieres

Compositions
Malcolm Arnold
Symphony No. 2
Carlos Chávez
Symphony for Strings (Symphony No. 5) 
George Crumb 
Sonata, for viola and piano 
Ernő Dohnányi 
American Rhapsody 
Karel Goeyvaerts 
Nummer 5
Cristóbal Halffter 
Piano Concerto 
Ernesto Halffter 
Fantasia española for cello and piano
Rodolfo Halffter 
Hojas de album (3) for piano, Op. 22 
Karl Amadeus Hartmann 
Concerto for piano, winds and percussion 
Arthur Honegger 
A Christmas Cantata 
Karel Husa
String Quartet No. 2
Andrew Imbrie 
String Quartet No. 2
György Ligeti 
Sonata for Solo Cello 
Bohuslav Martinů 
Concerto for violin, piano, and orchestra 
Overture
Fantaisies symphoniques (Symphony No. 6)
Peter Racine Fricker 
Viola Concerto 
Giacinto Scelsi 
Five Incantations for piano
Dmitri Shostakovich 
Ballet Suite No. 4 
Symphony No. 10 
Karlheinz Stockhausen 
Klavierstücke I–IV (revised version)
Kontra-Punkte 
Studie I 
Eugen Suchoň – Metamorphosis for orchestra
Ralph Vaughan Williams – The Old Hundredth Psalm Tune
Heitor Villa-Lobos 
Alvorada na Floresta Tropical for orchestra 
Cello Concerto No. 2
Fantaisie concertante for piano, clarinet and bassoon 
Harp Concerto 
Odisseia de uma raça, symphonic poem 
String Quartet No. 14
Symphony No. 10, Sumé Pater Patrium (Sinfonia ameríndia) (Sumé, Father of Fathers [Amerindian Symphony])

Opera
 The Decembrists (Yuri Shaporin) first staged 23 June 1953 at the Bolshoi Theatre, Moscow.
 The Dumb Wife (Joseph Horovitz), premiered 21 November 1953 at the Guildhall School, London, by the Intimate Opera Company.
 Gloriana (Benjamin Britten) composed 1953, first performed on 8 July 1953 at the Royal Opera House, Covent Garden in the presence of Elizabeth II.
 Irmelin (Frederick Delius) composed 1890–92; first produced Oxford, 4 May 1953.
 Lenora 40/50 (Rolf Liebermann) first produced in Berlin on 12 February 1953 at the State Opera House in the British sector.
 Man of Enterprise (Denis Bloodworth) first produced on 8 December 1953 at Tiffin School, Kingston, Surrey, by the school operatic society.
 Menna (Arwel Hughes) premiered by the Welsh National Opera at the Pavilion in Cardiff on 9 November, with the composer conducting.
 Nelson (Lennox Berkeley), premiered in a concert performance 14 February 1953 by the English Opera Group at Wigmore Hall, London.
 Sevil (Fikrat Amirov)
 Three's Company (Antony Hopkins), premiered 21 November 1953 at the Guildhall School, London, by the Intimate Opera Company.
 The Tinners of Cornwall (Inglis Gundry), premiered 30 September 1953 at Rudolf Steiner Hall, conducted by Geoffrey Corbett.

Jazz

Musical theater
  Airs On A Shoestring     London revue opened at the Royal Court Theatre on April 22 and ran for 772 performances
 At The Lyric     London production
 The Boy Friend (Sandy Wilson) commenced at London's Players Club on April 14 and reopened in an expanded version on October 13 before moving to the West End proper in 1954.
 Braziliana     London production
 The Buccaneer     London production
 Can-Can (Cole Porter) – Broadway production opened at the Shubert Theatre on May 7 and ran for 892 performances
 The Glorious Days West End production opens at the Palace Theatre on February 28 and ran for 246 performances
 Hazel Flagg Broadway production opened at the Mark Hellinger Theatre on February 11 and ran for 190 performances
 John Murray Anderson's Almanac Broadway revue opened at the Imperial Theatre on December 10 and ran for 227 performances
 The King And I (Richard Rodgers and Oscar Hammerstein II) London production opened at the Drury Lane Theatre on October 8 and ran for 926 performances
 Kismet Broadway production opened at the Ziegfeld Theatre on December 3 and ran for 583 performances
  Maggie Broadway production opened at the Royal National Theatre on February 18 and ran for 5 performances
  Me And Juliet     Broadway production opened at the Majestic Theatre on May 28 and ran for 358 performances
 Paint Your Wagon (Alan Jay Lerner and Frederick Loewe) – London production opened at Her Majesty's Theatre on February 11 and ran for 477 performances
  The Wayward Way
  Wonderful Town (Leonard Bernstein, Betty Comden and Adolph Green) – Broadway production opened at the Winter Garden Theatre on February 25 and ran for 559 performances

Musical films
 The Affairs of Dobie Gillis starring Debbie Reynolds, Bobby Van, Barbara Ruick and Bob Fosse
 The Band Wagon
 By the Light of the Silvery Moon
 Calamity Jane starring Doris Day and Howard Keel
 The Desert Song
 The Farmer Takes a Wife starring Betty Grable, Dale Robertson, John Carroll, Thelma Ritter and Eddie Foy, Jr.
 Gentlemen Prefer Blondes
 I Love Melvin starring Debbie Reynolds and Donald O'Connor
 The Jazz Singer
 Kiss Me Kate starring Howard Keel, Kathryn Grayson, Ann Miller, Keenan Wynn and James Whitmore
 Lili
 Peter Pan animated feature
 Singin' in the Rain starring Gene Kelly, Donald O'Connor and Debbie Reynolds
 Small Town Girl starring Jane Powell, Ann Miller, Farley Granger, S. Z. Sakall, Bobby Van, Billie Burke, Fay Wray and featuring Nat "King" Cole. Directed by László Kardos.
 So This Is Love released July 15 starring Kathryn Grayson as Grace Moore.
 The Stooge released February 4 starring Martin and Lewis.
 Three Sailors and a Girl starring Jane Powell, Gordon MacRae and Gene Nelson
Torch Song released October 23 starring Joan Crawford and Michael Wilding

Births
January 6 – Malcolm Young, rock musician (AC/DC) (d. 2017)
January 10 – Pat Benatar, singer ("Hit Me with Your Best Shot" etc.)
January 21 – Glenn Kaiser, American singer-songwriter and guitarist (Resurrection Band)
January 23 – Robin Zander, rock musician (Cheap Trick)
January 26 – Lucinda Williams, singer
January 29
Louie Perez (Los Lobos)
Teresa Teng, singer
February 3 – Joëlle, singer (d. 1982)
February 18 – Robin Bachman, drummer (Bachman–Turner Overdrive and Brave Belt)
February 20 – Riccardo Chailly, conductor
February 26 – Michael Bolton, American singer (Blackjack)
March 3 – Robyn Hitchcock, singer-songwriter and guitarist
March 12 – Ryan Paris, singer
March 19 – Ricky Wilson (The B-52s) (d. 1985)
March 23 – Chaka Khan, singer
March 31
Sean Hopper (Huey Lewis and the News)
Greg Martin (The Kentucky Headhunters)
April 4 – Chen Yi, Chinese classical composer and violinist
April 21 – Todd Phillips, American bassist and composer (David Grisman Quintet)
April 28 
 Pat Donohue, guitarist (The Guys All-Star Shoe Band on A Prairie Home Companion)
 Kim Gordon, American musician, songwriter and visual artist
May 4 – Oleta Adams, American soul and jazz singer
May 8
Billy Burnette (Fleetwood Mac)
Alex Van Halen (Van Halen)
May 9 
Connie Kaldor, Canadian singer-songwriter
Kojo, singer
May 15 – Mike Oldfield, composer & musician
May 16 – Richard Page (Mr. Mister)
May 17 – George Johnson (The Brothers Johnson)
June 6 – June Yamagishi, Japanese-American guitarist (Papa Grows Funk and The Wild Magnolias)
June 7 – Johnny Clegg, mbaqanga and Afro-pop musician and musical anthropologist (d. 2019)
June 12 – Rocky Burnette, rock singer
June 19 – Larry Dunn, rock keyboardist (Earth Wind & Fire)
June 20 - Dušan Rapoš, composer
June 22 – Cyndi Lauper, singer-songwriter
June 29 – Colin Hay, rock singer-songwriter (Men at Work)
July 2 – Mark Hart, American guitarist and keyboard player (Crowded House and Supertramp)
July 6 – Nanci Griffith, American country folk singer-songwriter (Blue Moon Orchestra) (d. 2021)
July 11 – Bramwell Tovey, conductor (d. 2022)
July 18 – Warren Wiebe, American singer (d. 1998)
July 21 – Eric Bazilian, rock performer (The Hooters)
July 22
Jimmy Bruno, American guitarist
Sylvia Chang, Taiwanese actress, singer, director and screenwriter
July 29 – Geddy Lee (Rush)
July 31 – Hugh MacDowell (Electric Light Orchestra)
August 1 – Robert Cray, blues guitarist and singer
August 2 – Marjo, Canadian singer-songwriter (Corbeau)
August 12 – Peter Ostroushko, mandolinist, fiddler
August 16 – James "J.T." Taylor (Kool & the Gang)
August 17 – Kevin Rowland, vocalist (Dexys Midnight Runners)
August 24 – Ron Holloway, tenor saxophonist
August 27 – Alex Lifeson, prgressive rock guitarist (Rush)
August 29 – Rick Downey, rock drummer (Blue Öyster Cult)
September 2 – John Zorn, composer
September 7 – Benmont Tench, rock keyboardist (Tom Petty and the Heartbreakers etc.)
September 11 – Tommy Shaw, hard rock guitarist (Styx)
September 27
Greg Ham, pop rock multi-instrumentalist (Men at Work)
Robbie Shakespeare, reggae bassist (d. 2021)
September 28 – Jim Diamond, pop singer-songwriter (Ph.D.) (d. 2015)
October 7 – Tico Torres, Bon Jovi
October 10 – Midge Ure, singer-songwriter
October 14 – Kazumi Watanabe, jazz performer
October 15 – Tito Jackson (The Jackson 5)
October 16- Tony Carey (Rainbow)
October 21 – Charlotte Caffey (The Go-Go's)
October 21 – Eric Faulkner, guitarist and singer-songwriter (Bay City Rollers)
October 26 – Keith Strickland (The B-52s)
October 28 – Desmond Child, American songwriter and producer 
October 31 – Johnny Clegg, singer and instrumentalist
November 11 – Andy Partridge (XTC)
November 13
Keith Green, gospel singer-songwriter (d. 1982)
Andrew Ranken, Celtic punk drummer (The Pogues)
November 18 – Jan Kuehnemund, American guitarist (Vixen) (d. 2013)
November 22 – Urmas Alender, singer (Ruja, Propeller)
November 23 – Francis Cabrel, folk singer/songwriter
December 12 
Bruce Kulick, American guitarist and songwriter (Kiss, Grand Funk Railroad, Blackjack, Union and Eric Singer Project)
Dave Meniketti, American singer-songwriter and guitarist (Y&T)
December 15 – Hossam Ramzy, Egyptian percussionist (d. 2019)
December 26 – Harry Christophers, English choral conductor
December 30 – Graham Vick, English opera director (d. 2021)
Undated 
 David Owen Norris, English classical pianist, composer, academic and broadcaster
 Jamie Spears, father of singer-songwriters and actresses: Jamie Lynne Spears and Britney Spears (estranged)

Deaths
January 1 – Hank Williams, country musician, 29
January 18 – Arthur Wood, composer, 78
February 2 – Gustav Strube, conductor and composer, 75
March 5
E. T. Cook, organist and composer, 72
Sergei Prokofiev, composer, 61
March 19 – Irène Bordoni, singer and actress, 68
March 29 – Arthur Fields, singer-songwriter, 64
April 23 – Peter DeRose, Tin Pan Alley composer, 53
April 29 – Kiki, "The Queen of Montparnasse", 51 (drug- and alcohol-related) 
April 30 – Lily Brayton, musical theatre star, 76
May 15 – Mabel Love, dancer, 78
May 16 – Django Reinhardt, jazz guitarist, 43 (brain hemorrhage)
May 19 – Frank Mullings, tenor, 72
May 22 – Frederick Jackson, librettist and screenwriter (66)
May 30 – Dooley Wilson, actor, singer and pianist, 67
June 3 – Florence Price, composer, 66
June 10 – Grzegorz Fitelberg, conductor, violinist and composer, 73
June 21 – Ford Dabney, composer and vaudevillian, 75
June 25 – Jules Van Nuffel, musicologist and composer, 70
July 5 – Titta Ruffo, operatic baritone, 76
July 17 – Bernhard van den Sigtenhorst Meyer, Dutch composer, 65
August 14 – Friedrich Schorr, operatic bass-baritone, 64
August 29 – Darrell Fancourt, bass-baritone, 67
September 1 – Jacques Thibaud, violinist, 72
September 21 – Roger Quilter, composer, 75
October 3 – Sir Arnold Bax, composer, 69
October 8 – Kathleen Ferrier, English contralto, 41 (cancer)
October 18 – Marguerite d'Alvarez, operatic contralto, exact age unknown
October 27 – Eduard Künneke, composer, 68
October 29 – William Kapell, pianist, 31
October 30 – Emmerich Kálmán, composer, 71
November 10 – Theodora Morse, lyricist, 70
November 18 – Ruth Crawford Seeger, composer, 52
November 21 – Larry Shields, jazz musician, 60
November 26 – Ivor Atkins, organist and choirmaster, 83
December 5
Noel Mewton-Wood, pianist, 31 (suicide by poisoning)
Jorge Negrete, singer and actor, 42 (hepatitis)
December 9 – Issay Dobrowen, pianist, conductor and composer, 62
December 11 – Albert Coates, conductor and composer, 71
December 29 – Violet MacMillan, Broadway star, 66

References

 
20th century in music
Music by year